Rous Lench is a village and civil parish in Wychavon, Worcestershire, England.

Rous Lench Court, a 16th-century timber-framed building formerly the seat of the Rouse baronets, is a Grade II* listed building.

St Peter's Church, Rous Lench is Grade I listed. Dating from the 12th century, the Norman church was enlarged and partly rebuilt by Frederick Preedy between 1884 and 1896.

Rous Lench Village Hall,  built in 1885 and deeded to the village in 1947, hosts public events and is available for hire.

References

External links 

Villages in Worcestershire
Civil parishes in Worcestershire
Wychavon